Like Father, Like Daughter is a Singaporean Chinese drama which is being telecast on Singapore's free-to-air channel, MediaCorp TV Channel 8. It made its debut on 21 August 2007 and ended its run on 17 September 2007. This drama serial consists of 20 episodes, and was screened on every weekday night, 9pm.

Cast

 Joanne Peh as Dai Chunchun
 Zheng Geping as Jin Gang aka King Kong
 Kang Cheng Xi as Chris Li Kaizhe

Plot
Zhigang aka Jingang (Zheng Geping), a well-built but simple-minded father has an intelligent and vivacious daughter Chunchun. Unfortunately, Jingang who is always between jobs, does not know how to bring up or educate his rebellious daughter. In the end, Chunchun has to be transferred from school to school as a result of disciplinary problems. Nevertheless, Jingang still has high hopes that she will embark on a successful career, either as a doctor or lawyer.

Implicated by his cronies, Jingang is jailed. With her only family member behind bars, Chunchun (Cherryann) has to be put up for adoption against her wishes. She decides to run away and while wandering the streets, she is taken in by an eccentric rag & bone old woman. Despite her strange personality, the old lady (Jin Yinji) gets along very well with Chunchun. Before long, Chunchun has grown up. Although she is very pretty, she pays little attention to her appearance. In addition, as a result of her fiery temper, those who know her tend to give her a wide berth. Instead of fulfilling her father’s wish of becoming a doctor or lawyer, Chunchun (Joanne Peh) runs a string of successful small-time ‘heterodox’ businesses in Queenstown, ranging from paper and cardboard trade, scrap business, illegal food peddling to provision of lion dance performances during festive seasons.

As Chunchun is not interested in affairs of the heart, she keeps those suitors who want to woo her at arm’s length. It is not until she meets Li Kaize (Kang Cheng Xi), a very good-looking undergraduate, that she changes her mind. However, as Kaize is learned and comes from a wealthy background, Chunchun is acutely conscious of their disparity and does not harbour any romantic illusions about him. Kaize is initially quite put off by Chunchun’s boorish mannerism. However, after further interaction, he is attracted to her kind-heartedness and her lack of pretence.

After his release from jail, Jingang immediately looks for his daughter. As Chunchun does not want to disappoint her father who has pinned high hopes on her, she tries to keep her whereabouts a secret from him. Jingang is once again implicated by his cronies and with Chunchun’s help, he is finally able to leave the clutches of the underworld. Both father and daughter are finally reunited after 10 years. They set up a business together hand in hand.

Chunchun decides to work hard. Encouraged by Kaize, she enrols in English classes. Apart from her inferiority complex, there are also many girls vying for Kaize’s attention which discourages Chunchun from holding out any hope of a future with him. As such, she is caught by surprise when Kaize suddenly declares his love for her. Will they be able to overcome the disparity in their academic qualifications, social background and human intervention to come together?

Viewership

Awards
This drama managed to secure the 2nd most nominations in the Star Awards 2007, which was a total of 5 nominations, 1 nomination less than Mars VS Venus. The other dramas that are nominated are Mars vs Venus 幸福双人床, The Homecoming 十三鞭, The Peak 最高点, and Metamorphosis 破茧而出.

Star Awards 2007

References

External links
 Theme song
 Official Website (English Edition)
 Official Website (Chinese Edition)

Singapore Chinese dramas
2007 Singaporean television series debuts
2007 Singaporean television series endings
Channel 8 (Singapore) original programming